Erinchin Lobsang Tayiji was a prince of the Khalkha federation in western Mongolia. See Altan Khan of Khalkha.

In 1662 he attacked, captured and put to death his eastern neighbor, the Dzasagtu Khan. This led the senior Tushetu Khan (Chaghun Dorji) to form a league and drive out the Altan-khan. In 1667 he was captured by Sengge, the Dzungar chief and was handed over to the (next) Dzasagtu Khan . With the help of the Dzungars and Peking (divide and conquer), he was able to reinstate himself, but in 1682 he was captured by the Dzasagtu Khan. In 1691 he, and his khanate, disappear from the records.

 

17th-century Mongol rulers